Compassberg, is a mountain peak of the Sneeuberge range in South Africa. It is located 55 km due north of Graaff-Reinet in the Eastern Cape Province. At 2504 metres, it is the highest peak in South Africa outside the Stormberg-Drakensberg massif. It was named by Colonel Robert Jacob Gordon when he accompanied Governor Joachim van Plettenberg on a journey to the eastern frontier of the Cape Colony in 1778.

The mountain is composed of sediments of the Beaufort Series in the Karoo System, and extensively intruded by dolerite dikes and sills.

References

External links

Climbing the Compassberg
Nieu Bethesda- What to do
Compassberg picture from Panoramio

Mountains of the Eastern Cape
Karoo